Kaluga State University (KSU), or in full, Kaluga State University in the name of K. E. Tsiolkovsky is a university in Kaluga, Russia. 

The university was founded in 1948 as Kaluga State Pedagogical Institute. In 1963 it was named K. E. Tsiolkovsky Kaluga State Pedagogical Institute, in honour of rocket scientist Konstantin Tsiolkovsky. In 1994 it became K. E. Tsiolkovsky Kaluga State Pedagogical University, and in 2010 K. E. Tsiolkovsky Kaluga State University.

The university consists of six institutes: Natural Sciences, History and Law, Pedagogics, Psychology, Social Relationships, and Physics and Technologies; two faculties: Foreign Languages, and Philology, and the institutes of Pre-University Training, and Additional Professional Training.

There are three museums in the university: The Museum of KSU's history; The Museum-study of Alexander Chizhevsky; The Museum of the Natural Sciences' Institute.

The University publishes the scientific quarterly "The Kaluga University Bulletin".

Names
1948-1963 — Kaluga State Pedagogical Institute
1963-1994 — Tsiolkovsky Kaluga State Pedagogical Institute
1994-2010 — Tsiolkovsky Kaluga State Pedagogical University
Since 2010 — Tsiolkovsky Kaluga State University

Gallery

External links
Official website

Universities in Kaluga Oblast
Kaluga
Educational institutions established in 1948
1948 establishments in Russia
Kaluga State University